The Gold Coast Clippers were a foundation team in the now defunct Australian Baseball League. The Clippers changed their name to the Daikyo Dolphins following the signing of a major sponsorship deal with Daikyo to create one of the strongest teams in ABL history.

History

See also

Sport in Australia
Australian Baseball
Australian Baseball League (1989–1999)

External links
The Australian Baseball League: 1989–1999

Australian Baseball League (1989–1999) teams
Defunct baseball teams in Australia
Sporting teams based on the Gold Coast, Queensland